Verminous is the ninth studio album by American melodic death metal band The Black Dahlia Murder. It was released on April 17, 2020, through Metal Blade Records. This is the band's final album to feature original member and lead vocalist Trevor Strnad before his death on May 11, 2022.

Track listing

Personnel
The Black Dahlia Murder
 Trevor Strnad – lead vocals
 Brian Eschbach – rhythm guitar, backing vocals
 Brandon Ellis – lead guitar, backing vocals
 Max Lavelle – bass
 Alan Cassidy – drums

Additional musicians
 Michaël Ghelfi - sewer ambience 

Production and design
 The Black Dahlia Murder - production
 Brandon Ellis - production
 Ryan Williams - recording (drums)
 Brandon Ellis - recording (guitars, bass and vocals)
 Tue Madsen - mixing
 Alan Douches - mastering
 Josh Dillon and Nick Morris - drum assistance
 Juanjo Castellano - cover art
 Shoggoth Kinetics - artwork
 Fetusk - design
 David E. Jackson - photography
 Brian Slagel - executive producer

References

2020 albums
The Black Dahlia Murder (band) albums
Metal Blade Records albums